Esta Voz que me Atravessa is the second album by Portuguese fado singer Mafalda Arnauth. It was released in 2001 by EMI Valentim de Carvalho. In praise of this album, Andreas Dorschel writes: "capable of the tenderest nuances of voice, she [Mafalda Arnauth] ingeniously counterbalances them with a roughness that calls to mind fado’s subcultural origins.“

Track listing
Esta Voz Que Me Atravessa"
“O Instante Dos Sentidos"
“Ee Não Saber Ser Loucura"
“Coisa Assim"
“Este Silêncio Que Me Corta"
“Até Logo, Meu Amor"
“Não Há Fado Que Te Resista"
“Lusitana"
“Há Noite Aqui"
“Ai Do Vento"
“Ora vai"
“A Casa E O Mundo"

Personnel
José Martins - direction and arrangement
Amélia Muje - production
José Elmiro Nunes - Fado guitar
Paulo Paz - double bass
Ricardo Rocha - Portuguese guitar

References

2001 albums
Mafalda Arnauth albums